Hong Kong League Cup 2004–05 is the 5th staging of the Hong Kong League Cup.

The competition sponsor was Sunray Cave Limited.

Sun Hei captured the champion for 3 consecutive times after beating Happy Valley by 1-0 in the final.

Group stage
All times are Hong Kong Time (UTC+8).

Group A

Group B

Knockout stage

Bracket

Semi-finals

Final

Individual Awards
 Best Defensive Player:  Cristiano Cordeiro of Sun Hei
 Top Scorer:  Ernestina of Happy Valley

Trivia
 Happy Valley and Sun Hei's crash in the final was the third consecutive time in this competition. Sun Hei won in all the three times.

References
 www.rsssf.com Hongkong 2004/05
 HKFA Website 聯賽盃回顧(五) (in chinese)

Hong Kong League Cup
League Cup
Hong Kong League Cup